Stefan Matz  is a German head chef of Ashford Castle and The g Hotel. He was, together with his brother, owner of the Michelin starred restaurant and hotel Erriseask House in Ballyconneely in County Galway, Ireland.

Matz did his training in Germany and Switzerland, working amongst others in Restaurant Chesery in Gstaad. From 1989 to 2001 he was co-owner and head chef of Erriseask House. He left to work in Portmarnock Hotel and Golf Links in Dublin. In 2003 he left the big city and joined the kitchen brigade of Asford Castle in Cong, County Galway.

Awards
Erriseask House
 Chef of the Year 1995 - Egon Ronay Guide
 Bib Gourmand 1998
 Irish Beef Award 1999 - Georgina Campbell's Ireland Guide
 Michelin star with Erriseask House 2000 and 2001

Portmarnock Hotel and Golf Links
 Three AA Rosettes

Ashford Castle
 Chef of the Year 2007 - Georgina Campbell's Ireland Guide
 Best Chef 2010 - 2010 Ireland Good Eating Guide

Personal life
According to Georgina Campbell's Ireland Guide, Matz is a modest but highly skilled chef.

References 

Irish chefs
Living people
Head chefs of Michelin starred restaurants
Year of birth missing (living people)
Male chefs